The Chiriquí Viejo River is a river of Panama.

It should not be confused with the Chiriquí Nuevo to the east.

There are several dams and hydroelectric projects on this river, including the Bajo de Mina and Baitún.

See also
List of rivers of Panama

References

 Rand McNally, The New International Atlas, 1993.
CIA map, 1995.

Rivers of Panama